Third row seating refers to seating in a vehicle such as a station wagon, SUV, MPV, or minivan to expand seating beyond the front and back seat found in most automobiles. Such vehicles commonly seat between 6 and up to 9 persons.

In the 1960s and 1970s, station wagons based on automobiles often had rear-facing folding seats which were entered by a 2 or 3-way tailgate. Ford used dual-side facing seats which faced each other. Some such as the Oldsmobile Vista Cruiser had a forward-facing third row, an arrangement also common in SUVs such as the Chevrolet Suburban. Most minivans have 3 rows of seating.

Third row seats may be fixed, removable, or designed to fold into the floor, or against the walls. Some are power operated with a switch.

See also 

 Station wagon
 Minivan

References 

Auto parts
Seating